The size premium is the historical tendency for the stocks of firms with smaller market capitalizations to outperform the stocks of firms with larger market capitalizations. It is one of the factors in the Fama–French three-factor model.

See also 

Style investing

References

External links

Stock market